Victoria Alexander (born 1950) is an American author of historical romance novels.  She has been nominated for the Romantic Times Reviewers' Choice Award four times, winning once, for A Visit From Sir Nicholas, which Romantic Times described as "overflowing with heart-tugging scenes, simmering sexual tension, marvelous characters and meaningful lessons about life and love. "  Alexander has also won a Romantic Times Career Achievement Award.

On September 4, 2007, Avon Books released Alexander's newest novel, Lady Amelia's Secret Lover, as an e-book original, including an embedded video with Alexander's comments about the plot and characters.

Life 
Alexander was born in Washington D.C., grew up as an "Air Force brat", and travelled the world at a young age. She now lives in Omaha, Nebraska with her husband and two dogs, Louie and Reggie. She has a two grown children.

Bibliography

Millworth Manor 

 What Happens at Christmas (2012)
 The Importance of Being Wicked (2013) 
 The Scandalous Adventures of the Sister of the Bride (2014)
 The Shocking Secret of a Guest at the Wedding (2014)
 The Daring Exploits of a Runaway Heiress (2015)

Lady’s Travelers Society 

 The Lady Travelers Guide to Scoundrels and Other Gentlemen (2017)
 The Lady Travelers Guide to Larceny with a Dashing Stranger (2018)
 The Lady Travelers Guide to Deception with an Unlikely Earl (2018)
 The Lady Travelers Guide to Happily Ever After (2019)

Effington Family
 The Wedding Bargain (1999)
 The Husband List (2000)
 The Marriage Lesson (2001)
 The Prince's Bride (2001)
 Her Highness, My Wife (2002)
 Love with the Proper Husband (2003)
 The Lady in Question (2003)
 The Pursuit of Marriage (2004)
 A Visit from Sir Nicholas (2004)
 When We Meet Again (2005)
 Let It Be Love (2005)

Last Man Standing
 A Little Bit Wicked (2006)
 What a Lady Wants (2007)
 Secrets of a Proper Lady (2007)
 Seduction of a Proper Gentleman (2008)

Harrington Brothers
The Perfect Wife (1997)
The Virgin's Secret (2009)
 Desires of a Perfect Lady (2010)

Sinful Family Secrets
 His Mistress By Christmas (2011)
 My Wicked Little Lies (2012)

Novels
Yesterday and Forever (1995)
The Perfect Wife (1996)
Princess and the Pea (1996)
Emperor's New Clothes (1997)
Believe (1998)
Play It Again Sam (1998)
Paradise Bay (1999)
The Perfect Mistress (2011)
What Happens At Christmas (2011)

Omnibus
The Night Before Christmas: Promises to Keep / Naughty or Nice / Santa Reads Romance / Gift for Santa (1996) (with Sandra Hill, Dara Joy and Nelle McFather)
Santa Paws (1997) (with Nina Coombs, Annie Kimberlin and Miriam Raftery)
The Cat's Meow (1998) (with Nina Coombs, Coral Smith Saxe and Colleen Shannon)
Secrets of a Perfect Night (2000) (with Rachel Gibson and Stephanie Laurens)
The One That Got Away (2004) (with Liz Carlyle, Eloisa James and Cathy Maxwell)

References

External links
Victoria Alexander Official Website

20th-century American novelists
21st-century American novelists
American romantic fiction writers
American women novelists
Living people
1965 births
20th-century American women writers
21st-century American women writers